Oliver is an unincorporated community in Whiteside County, Illinois, United States.

Notes

Unincorporated communities in Whiteside County, Illinois
Unincorporated communities in Illinois